Rockstar Games is a video game publisher established under Take-Two Interactive in 1998. It is best known for the Grand Theft Auto series; other well-known releases include Bully, L.A. Noire, and the Red Dead, Manhunt, Max Payne and Midnight Club series.

List

Unreleased

References 

 
Rockstar Games